The 1979–80 Eastern Illinois Panthers men's basketball team represented the Eastern Illinois University during the 1979–80 NCAA Division II men's basketball season.

Roster

Schedule

References 

Eastern Illinois Panthers men's basketball seasons
Eastern Illinois Panthers men's basket
Eastern Illinois Panthers men's basket